El Tumbador is a town and municipality in the San Marcos department of Guatemala. The population is mostly of Mam people, who speak their own language. It was founded in 1878.

The main source of income is agriculture—farming and animal husbandry. People produce mostly coffee, but also sugarcane, beans, cassava, fruits and spices—cardamom and macadamia. Cattle, horses, sheep and goats are bred in the area as well.

El Tumbador gave its name to the Belgian Non-governmental organization Tumbador vzw that used to support a project in the municipality.

Climate

El Tumbador has tropical climate (Köppen: Am).

Geographic location

It is surrounded by San Marcos Department municipalities:

See also

References

External links
Tourist information

Municipalities of the San Marcos Department
Populated places established in 1878